Arthur Henry Collett (18 April 1870 – 20 August 1930) was an Australian politician who served as Mayor of Parramatta from 1912 to 1913 and 1928 to 1930 in his second term.

His second and last mayoral term came to a sudden end when he passed away, making him one of the few Mayors of Parramatta to die in office.

Biography
Arthur was born in Mudgee during Colonial New South Wales. His father, Henry Collett, was an English soldier and came to Australia with one of the regiments. Later his father joined the Prisons Department and saw service at several New South Wales gaols. When his father died he left a young family, Arthur being the eldest.

At the age of ten, Arthur came to Parramatta with his widowed mother and younger brothers and sisters. He has frequently told how he helped keep the home fires burning by selling newspapers at Parramatta Railway Station. For some time he lived at Inkerman-street, South Parramatta and attended Parramatta Public School. On leaving school he went to work at Hudson Bros carriage works at Clyde, where he remained for a few years.

In 1895, he married Frances Maud Bailey at Parramatta and shortly afterwards entered the dairying business, though later on in his life he remarried to Georgina Eliza Sarah McDonald. At the time of his death, he had been conducting a dairy for 35 years. He was a warm supporter of the Methodist Church. For many years he was a member of the Parramatta Licensing Board. Arthur was appointed deputy sheriff at Parramatta three years before his death.

For more than 20 years, he had been secretary of the Dairymen's Association and when the recently established Milk Board came into being he was elected unopposed as the metropolitan representative. In February 1903, he was elected unopposed to Parramatta Council as a representative of Gore Ward and had sat continuously in the council for 27 years.

During World War I, he worked hard on behalf of various patriotic funds. He was survived by his widow and a family of four sons and five daughters.

In Parramatta, there is a park named after Arthur called "Collet Park" which opened in 1932 with a memorial dedicated to Arthur.

There was a fairly large gathering at Collett Park when the Governor unveiled a stone pillar and tablet erected to the memory of the late Mayor Arthur Collett. Govenor Sir Philip met the sons and daughters of Arthur, and told them that he was sure that the memorial was well-earned and that they should feel consoled in their loss by the knowledge that their father was held in such high esteem.

The tablet reads:

Collett Park

In memory of the late Alderman A. H. Collett (Mayor)

This tablet was unveiled by His Excellency Sir Philip Woolcott Game G.B.E, K.C.B., D.S.O  Governor of New South Wales on the 1st Day of September, 1932

References

External links
 Arthur H Collett 1912-13, 1928-30 | Parramatta History and Heritage
 Alderman Arthur Collett | Monument Australia
 Arthur Henry Collett
 12 Dec 1929 - COLLETT AGAIN - Trove
 12 Feb 1913 - Parramatta's Mayor. - Trove
 20 Aug 1930 - SUDDEN DEATH - Trove

1870 births
1930 deaths
Mayors and Lord Mayors of Parramatta
Parramatta
Parramatta
20th-century Australian politicians
20th-century Australian public servants